The 78th Infantry Division (78-ya Pekhotnaya Diviziya) was an infantry formation of the Russian Imperial Army.

Organization
1st Brigade
309th Infantry Regiment
310th Infantry Regiment
2nd Brigade
311th Infantry Regiment
312th Infantry Regiment

References

Infantry divisions of the Russian Empire